Giselle Gómez Rolón (Born in Recoleta, Argentina, October 30,) is an Argentine model, showgirl and panelist.

Biography 
Gomez Rolón began her modeling career at the age of 19. She also had small theatrical roles. Gómez Rolón was panelist of the programmes Tiempo Extra of TyC Sports and Uno más uno tres of Canal 26
In January 2016 she went to Chile where she was a panelist on the Toc Show programme on UCV Television. She won in the Miss Reef beauty contest and was a candidate for Queen of the Festival of Viña del Mar

Television 
 2012-2014 Tiempo Extra TyC Sports
 2013 Animales Sueltos América
 2013-2015 Uno más uno tres Canal 26
 2016 Toc Show UCV Television
 2016 Todos juegan UCV Television
 2016 El show después del late Vive
 2016 Primer Plano Chilevisión
 2016 Morandé con Compañía Mega

References 

1988 births
Living people
People from Buenos Aires
Argentine female models
Argentine television personalities
Women television personalities
Argentine vedettes
21st-century Argentine women